Hisar District (also transliterated as Hissar, Gissar) is a former district in the Region of Republican Subordination, in Tajikistan, located west of the capital Dushanbe, between Varzob District in the east and Shahrinav District in the west. Its capital Hisar  is a town of 50,000 people about 10 km west of Dushanbe, at the center of the fertile Hisar Valley. Around 2018, the district was merged into the city of Hisar.

Administrative divisions
The district was divided administratively into jamoats. They were as follows (and population).

See also
Hisar Air Base

References

External links 
 

Former districts of Tajikistan